Halieutopsis nasuta, also known as the big-nosed deepsea batfish, is a species of fish in the family Ogcocephalidae.

It is found in the Indian Ocean around India.

References

Ogcocephalidae
Marine fish genera
Fish described in 1891
Taxa named by Alfred William Alcock